Clibanornis is a genus of birds in the family Furnariidae. Formerly, it contained only the Canebrake groundcreeper but phylogenetic studies revealed that this species is closely related to other four species formerly placed in Automolus (Ruddy foliage-gleaner and Santa Marta foliage-gleaner) and Hyloctistes (Henna-hooded foliage-gleaner and Henna-capped foliage-gleaner).

It contains the following species:
 Canebrake groundcreeper, Clibanornis dendrocolaptoides
 Ruddy foliage-gleaner, Clibanornis rubiginosus
 Santa Marta foliage-gleaner, Clibanornis rufipectus
 Henna-hooded foliage-gleaner, Clibanornis erythrocephalus
 Henna-capped foliage-gleaner, Clibanornis rectirostris

References

External links

 
Bird genera
Taxa named by Philip Sclater
Taxa named by Osbert Salvin
Taxonomy articles created by Polbot